E140 may refer to:
 Chlorophyll, a green pigment with E number E140
 Acer beTouch E140, a smartphone
 Toyota Corolla (E140), a car